Castleconnell railway station, opened on 8 August 1858 on the Great Southern and Western Railway line, serves the town of Castleconnell in County Limerick, Ireland. 

It is on the Limerick–Ballybrophy railway line and is also served by a skeleton service on the Limerick to Nenagh Commuter Service. It is unstaffed and has a small car park

Train service
Trains towards Ballybrophy (via Birdhill, Nenagh, Cloughjordan and Roscrea) run at 06.52 and 17.15  (Sunday 17.40)

Trains to Limerick 08.22 11.44 20.37 (Sunday 17.45 and 21.17)

Closure proposed
A January 2012 national newspaper article suggested that Iarnród Éireann was expected to seek permission from the National Transport Authority to close the line. however in February 2012 an enhanced timetable was launched. In the revised timetable of Feb 2013 services were again reduced.

Location
The station is located at the level crossing east of the centre of Castleconnell. It is near Castleconnell National School.

References

External links
Castleconnell Station on Eire Trains
Ballybrophy-Roscrea-Nenagh-Limerick line

Iarnród Éireann stations in County Limerick
Railway stations in County Limerick
Railway stations opened in 1858